Everett Glen Burkhalter (January 19, 1897 – May 24, 1975) was an American film studio electrician who turned to politics in 1941 and became a member of the California State Assembly, the Los Angeles City Council and the U.S. Congress in the middle part of the 20th century.

Biography
Burkhalter was born in Heber Springs, Arkansas, on January 19, 1897. He attended schools in Arkansas, Indiana, Colorado and California. He enlisted in the Navy in 1918, was honorably discharged in 1919 and was in the active reserve until 1921. He moved to Los Angeles around 1928 and married his wife, Velma, around 1929. Their home was at 11005 Morrison Street, North Hollywood.

Burkhalter died at age 78 on May 24, 1975, in Duarte, California. Interment was in Forest Lawn Memorial Park. He was survived by his wife of 46 years, Velma, and two brothers, William of Woodland Hills and Lawrence of Los Angeles.

Public service

Assembly

Burkhalter served in the California State Assembly for the 42nd district from 1941 to 1947. He decided to not run for a 4th term and ran for congress in the 20th congressional district, which he ended up losing. 2 years later after he lost. He decided to run for his old seat and ended up winning. He served for another 2 years from 1951 to 1953.

City  Council

Elections

Burkhalter made his first bid for local office in 1939, when he finished third in a field of four candidates for the Los Angeles City Council District 1 seat held by Jim Wilson. Burkhalter was elected in his second attempt, in 1953, replacing Leland S. Warburton in the district. Burkhalter was reelected in 1957 and 1961 to four-year terms, but he resigned from the council in 1962 when he won an election for Congress.

Positions

Burkhalter supported the plan to bring the Los Angeles Dodgers to Chavez Ravine in Los Angeles and voted for Bunker Hill development. Some of his other positions:

Employment, 1958. He voted in favor of establishing a Fair Employment Practices Commission in Los Angeles. The plan lost on a 7–7 tie vote.

Television, 1958. Burkhalter voted in opposition to pay television in Los Angeles.

Smog, 1959. He engaged in a war of words with officials at Kaiser Steel in Fontana when he accused the steelmakers of loosing a "stream of  smoke from the plant .  . . into the general Los Angeles area. On some days the emissions . . . can be observed from the top of the City Hall."

Movies, 1961. He submitted a resolution urging that a Congressional committee study the problem of American movies' being made overseas.  He noted a report that "60% of this country's movies will be made in  Europe this year" and that "Communists are being hired in at least one foreign country and that they are doing the work formerly done" in Los Angeles. The resolution was adopted after being amended to include the music industry at the suggestion of Councilman Ernani Bernardi.

HUAC, 1962. Burkhalter announced he would start a fund to send "to Russia" protesters picketing a House Committee on Un-American Activities meeting in Los Angeles, "if they desired to go."

Zoo, 1962. He fought vehemently—but unsuccessfully—to move the Los Angeles Zoo from its location in Griffith Park to Roger Jessup Park in Pacoima,  a step that had been recommended by architect Charles Luckman.

Congress

Burkhalter served one term in the U.S. Congress from 1962 to 1964 as a Democrat.

References

Access to the Los Angeles Times links may require the use of a library card.

Democratic Party members of the United States House of Representatives from California
People from Heber Springs, Arkansas
1897 births
1975 deaths
Los Angeles City Council members
Burials at Forest Lawn Memorial Park (Hollywood Hills)
20th-century American politicians
Democratic Party members of the California State Assembly